Hethersgill is a civil parish in the Carlisle district of Cumbria, England.  It contains 17 listed buildings that are recorded in the National Heritage List for England.  All the listed buildings are designated at Grade II, the lowest of the three grades, which is applied to "buildings of national importance and special interest".  The parish contains the villages of Hethersgill and Kirklinton, and is otherwise rural.  Most of the listed buildings are houses and associated structures, farmhouses and farm buildings.  The other listed buildings include relocated columns from a demolished church, a former Friends' meeting house, a war memorial, and a church hall.


Buildings

References

Citations

Sources

Lists of listed buildings in Cumbria